Louis Jacoby (7 June 1828 – 1918) was a German Jewish engraver.  Born in Havelberg, Brandenburg, Germany; pupil of the engraver Mandel of Berlin, in which city he settled.

Life
The year 1855 he spent in Paris; 1856 in Spain; and the years 1860-63 in Italy, especially in Rome. In 1863 he was appointed professor of engraving at the Vienna Academy, and in 1882 was called to Berlin as adviser on art to the imperial printing-office.

Works
Jacoby's first engraving, Tiarini's "St. John," appeared in 1850. His most important engravings are: Kaulbach's "Historical Allegory" and "The Battle of the Huns"; Raphael's "School of Athens" (of which he had made a copy during his stay at Rome); Soddoma's " The Wedding of Alexander and Roxana"; Winterhalter's "The Austrian Emperor Francis Joseph and the Empress Elizabeth"; as well as the portraits of many important scientists and members of society in the Austrian and German capitals, e.g., Rokitansky, Olfers, Ritter, Cornelius, Guhl, Mommsen, Henzen, Grillparzer, Brücke, De la Motte-Fouqué and York von Wartenburg.

Jewish Encyclopedia bibliography
Meyers Konversations-Lexikon.

References

1828 births
1918 deaths
People from Havelberg
19th-century German Jews
Members of the Academy of Arts, Berlin
German engravers